In physics, deconfinement (in contrast to confinement) is a phase of matter in which certain particles are allowed to exist as free excitations, rather than only within bound states.

Examples
Various examples exist in particle physics where certain gauge theories exhibit transitions between confining and deconfining phases.

A prominent example, and the first case considered as such in theoretical physics, occurs at high energy in quantum chromodynamics when quarks and gluons are free to move over distances larger than a femtometer (the size of a hadron). This phase is also called the quark–gluon plasma.

These ideas have been adopted in many-body theory of matter with a distinguished example developed in the context fractional quantum Hall effect.

See also
Onset of deconfinement
Colour confinement
Quark–gluon plasma
Quark-nova
Fractionalization

Quark matter
Gluons